East Park Commando was a light infantry regiment of the South African Army. It formed part of the South African Army Infantry Formation as well as the South African Territorial Reserve.

History

Origins

Operations

With the SADF
The unit resorted under the command of the SADF's Group 18.

During this era, the unit was mainly engaged in area force protection, search and cordons as well as other assistance to the local police. 

As an urban unit, this commando was also tasked with protecting strategic facilities as well as quelling township riots especially during the State of Emergency in the 1980s.

National Colours
On Tuesday 26 April 1994, East Park Commando laid up its National Colours at the South African National Museum of Military History. The laying up of National Colours followed a decision of the Defence Command Council that this should be done owing to the replacement of the National Flag by a new National Flag on 27 April 1994. The laying up of Colours is, in the life of any unit in possession of Colours, an occasion of supreme historical significance.

With the SANDF

Disbandment
This unit, along with all other Commando units was disbanded after a decision by South African President Thabo Mbeki to disband all Commando Units. The Commando system was phased out between 2003 and 2008 "because of the role it played in the apartheid era", according to the Minister of Safety and Security Charles Nqakula.

Unit Insignia

Leadership

References

See also 
 South African Commando System

Infantry regiments of South Africa
South African Commando Units
Disbanded military units and formations in Johannesburg